Herbert Mayr (27 April 1943 – 6 September 2015) was an Italian politician from the autonomous German province of South Tyrol in Italy.

Mayr studied sport in Bologna during the mid-1960s, at the end of the 1970s was a professor at the University of Innsbruck and from 1987 until 1994 was the chairman of the sports club SSV Bozen.

Mayr was voted into the Bolzano city council on three occasions as a member of the South Tyrolean People's Party and served as the city's deputy mayor between 1985 and 1995. After being diagnosed with Parkinson's disease, Mayr is now the president of the Südtiroler Parkinson-Gesellschaft.

References

Further reading 
 

1943 births
2015 deaths
Politicians from Bolzano
Academic staff of the University of Innsbruck
People with Parkinson's disease
South Tyrolean People's Party politicians
Germanophone Italian people